Branko Rastislalić was the "Lord of Podunavlje" and Domestikos under Dušan the Mighty of the Serbian Empire from circa 1340; later he became vassal of the Hungarians until his death in 1352.

Branko issued his own regional coins, the 'Helmet dinars', only one of three existing prior to the fall of the Serbian Empire.
He ruled until his death in 1352, when he was accidentally killed by Vuk Kosača during a hunt. Branko's relatives later avenged his death in 1359, when they murdered Vuk.

He was succeeded by his son Radič Branković, Lord of Braničevo.

References

Oblasni gospodari u 14. veku, page 2 (Serbian)

14th-century Serbian nobility
Rastislalić noble family
1352 deaths
Year of birth unknown
Medieval Serbian magnates